Arthur Varney was an Italian-born American screenwriter and film director. Born as Amerigo Serrao he emigrated to the United States and became a naturalized citizen. In the 1930s he found work on the British film industry as Arthur Varney, and occasionally also used the credit of Grover Lee. He died in 1960.

Selected filmography

Director
 Winds of the Pampas (1927)
 The Road to Fortune (1930)
 The Wrong Mr. Perkins (1931)
 The Eternal Feminine (1931)
 Almost a Divorce (1931)
 Get That Venus (1933)

References

Bibliography
 Koszarski, Richard. Hollywood on the Hudson: Film and Television in New York from Griffith to Sarnoff. Rutgers University Press, 2008.

External links

Year of birth unknown
1960 deaths
Italian emigrants to the United States
20th-century Italian screenwriters
Italian male screenwriters
Italian film producers
Italian film directors
20th-century Italian male writers